Sabah Khoury (born November 10, 1982) is a former Lebanese basketball player who plays as a shooting guard for Sagesse Club in the Lebanese Basketball League (LBL). He formerly played for Champville Club, Amchit Club and Al Mouttahed Tripoli in the Lebanese Basketball League, and Qingdao Doublestar in the Chinese Basketball League. He has also participated in international championships with his teams and the Lebanese national basketball team.

Early years
Sabah Khoury was born in Kuwait on 10 November 1982 and lived in Lebanon until he was 15. He moved to the United States to finish high school.  He played at Okemos High School.  His career ended with a loss to Kalamazoo Central High School. He then joined Lansing Community College for one year to study Business Management before moving back to Lebanon at the age of 19 to continue his studies there.

While in the United States, Sabah played for the Lansing Community College team (2001–02).

Career 2002–2005
When Sabah moved back to Lebanon, after few meetings with Hekmeh BC's team and management, Sabah signed a three years contract with the team (2002–05) and started to play professionally at the age of 19.

2002–03 season
Team achievements
Lebanese Basketball League champion. (Hekmeh BC)
Lebanese Basketball Cup champion. (Hekmeh BC)

2003–04 season
Team achievements
Lebanese Basketball League champion. (Hekmeh BC)
West Asia Basketball League champion. (Hekmeh BC)
Asian Basketball Club Championship champion. (Hekmeh BC)
Individual achievements
Top assist player in the West Asia Basketball League

2004-–05 season
Team achievements
West Asia Basketball League champion. (Hekmeh BC)

Career 2005–06
After 2005, Sabah turned 22 and he was a free player since three years with Hekmeh BC. Coach Ghassan Sarkis wanted him to play for Champville SC, so Sabah took his chance and signed a one-year contract with the team (2005–06).

2005–06 season

Sabah helped the team reach the final 4 after their famous breakup that led most of their main players to Sporting Al Riyadi Beirut.

Career 2006–07
After 2006 in Champville SC, Sabah signed a 2-year contract with Hekmeh BC but in the same summer the president of the club resigned and Hekmeh BC was in a big mess. Meanwhile, Sabah was with the Lebanese national basketball team in the Basketball World Championship in Japan, and after he was back there was no team for Hekmeh BC. He picked Al Mouttahed Tripoli knowing that Hekmeh BC probably will not make a team and will drop to the second division. Few weeks after Sabah signed a one-year contract with Al Mouttahed Tripoli (2006–07), Hekmeh BC made a team in the last minute just to survive and prevent dropping to the second division and because it was too late the Lebanese Basketball Federation allowed them to sign with free players, so Sabah spent his year with Al Mouttahed Tripoli. It was a very short season for Sabah, because the team finished 5th in the league.

Career 2007–09
After his contract with Al Mouttahed Tripoli ended, Sabah was back to Hekmeh BC (his old home) with a 2-year contract (2007–09).

2007–08 season
Individual achievements'''
Best Arabic player in the Arab Basketball League.
First Lebanese assist player and second overall. 
Season stats:
22 games: 
14.4 ppg 
5.4 rpg 
6.4 apg 
1.9 spg

Teams
 Lansing Community College (2001–2002)
 Hekmeh BC (2002–2005)
 Champville SC (2005–2006)
 Al Mouttahed Tripoli (2006–2007)
 Hekmeh BC (2007–2009)
 Qingdao Doublestar (2009–2010)
 Hekmeh BC (2010–2012)
 Amchit Club (2012–2013)
 Champville SC (2013–2014)
 Hekmeh BC (2015-)

References

1982 births
Living people
Lebanese men's basketball players
Basketball players at the 2006 Asian Games
Shooting guards
Qingdao Eagles players
2006 FIBA World Championship players
Asian Games competitors for Lebanon
Sagesse SC basketball players